North Babylon Union Free School District is a school district in North Babylon, New York, United States. The current interim superintendent is Dr. Larry Aronstein.

The district operates seven schools: North Babylon High School, Robert Moses Middle School, Belmont Elementary School, Marion G. Vedder Elementary School, Parliament Place Elementary School, William E. DeLuca Jr. Elementary School, and Woods Road Elementary.

Administration 
The District offices are located 5 Jardine Place. The current Interim Superintendent is Dr. Larry Aronstein.

Administrators 
Interim Superintendent Dr. Larry Aronstein

Board of Education 
 Matthew Lucchetti, President
 Jeffrey Meyers, Vice President
 Theresa Callahan-Caroleo, Trustee
 Daniel D. Caroleom Trustee
 Keisha Rivers, Trustee
 Heather Rowland, Trustee
 Bob Scheid, Trustee

Selected Former Superintendents 
Previous assignment and reason for departure denoted in parentheses
Mr. Gene Grasso
Dr. John Micciche – Retired 2005
Dr. Randall D. Bos – 2005-2006 (Superintendent - Waterloo Central School District, suspended by North Babylon Board of Education for undisclosed reasons and retired)
Dr. Joseph Laria – 2006-2007
Dr. Robert Aloise
Mrs. Patricia Godek – 2011-2014
Mr. Glen Eschbach – 2015-2022

North Babylon High School 
North Babylon High School is located at 1 Phelps Drive and serves grades 9 through 12. The principal is Jonathan Klomp.

Robert Moses Middle School 
Robert Moses Middle School is located at 250 Phelps Drive and serves grades 6 through 8. The principal is Stephanie Hasandras.

Belmont Elementary 
Belmont Elementary School is located at 108 Barnum Street and serves grades K through 5. The principal is Valerie Jackson.

Marion G. Vedder Elementary School 
Marion G. Vedder Elementary School (formerly known as Deer Park Avenue ("DPA") Elementary School) is located at 794 Deer Park Avenue and serves grades P through 5. The principal is Kerry Larke.

Parliament Place Elementary School 
Parliament Place Elementary School is located at 80 Parliament Place and serves grades K through 5. The principal is Drew Olson.

William E. DeLuca Jr. Elementary School 
William E. Deluca Jr. Elementary School is located at 223 Phelps Lane and serves grades K through 5. The principal is Vincent Fantauzzi.

Woods Road Elementary School
Woods Road Elementary School is located at 110 Woods Road. The principal is Celeste Archer.

Former School Buildings 

Peter J. Brennan Junior High School - closed in the late 1980s, students in grades 7-8 moved to Robert Moses JHS, and students in grade 9 moved to North Babylon High School.  After closing, it served as the Suffolk County Police Academy for several years.  Currently, the building is now known as the Brennan Middle School and the Brennan High School for students with emotional and behavioral problems, and is run by Western Suffolk BOCES.

Weeks Road Elementary School - built in 1953 and closed in 1979, the school was demolished in the early 1980s and the land sold to developers.  Property is now known as the Primrose Lane Senior Community.

Phelps Lane Elementary School - closed in the 1980s.  The building now serves as the Town of Babylon Town Hall Annex.

References

External links
Official site

School districts in New York (state)
Education in Suffolk County, New York